Harry Goetschi (born 9 August 1939) is a Canadian bobsledder. He competed in the two-man event at the 1968 Winter Olympics.

References

1939 births
Living people
Canadian male bobsledders
Olympic bobsledders of Canada
Bobsledders at the 1968 Winter Olympics
Sportspeople from Zürich
Swiss emigrants to Canada